Benadiri Somali also referred to as “Coastal Somali” is a dialect of the Somali language. It is primarily spoken by the Benadiri people, who inhabit the southern Banaadir coast of Somalia.

Overview
Benadiri Somali is spoken on the Benadir coast, from Adale to south of Merca including Mogadishu, as well as in the immediate hinterland. The coastal dialects have additional phonemes that do not exist in Standard Somali.

Benadiri Somali is also referred to as Coastal Somali or Af-Reer Xamar ("Language of the People of Hamar").

Varieties 
Blench (2006) structures the dialect into three general subdivisions:

Northern Benadir (Abgaal, Ajuran, Huber, and Galjal)
Southern Benadir (Hamari, Bimaal)

Notes

References
ALSintl - Somali language

Somali language